The 2008 Bowling Green Falcons football team represented Bowling Green State University during the 2008 NCAA Division I FBS football season. The team's head football coach was Gregg Brandon. The Falcons played their home games at Doyt Perry Stadium in Bowling Green, Ohio. They were a member of the East Division of the Mid-American Conference. They finished the season 6–6, 4–4 in MAC play to finish in a tie for second place in the East Division. Despite being bowl eligible, they were not selected to participate in a bowl game.

Preseason
Shortly after the 2007 season, the Falcons lost backup quarterback, Anthony Glaud and wide receiver, Zach Charles to transfer as the pair made their way to defending MEAC champion Delaware State, because of lack of playing time.  On May 12, the Football Writers Association of America announced that Bowling Green senior defensive lineman Diyral Briggs was placed on their watch list for the Bronko Nagurski Trophy, awarded to the nation's top defensive player.  At the MAC football media day, the Falcons were voted as the preseason favorites to win the East Division crown, garnering 17 first place votes and 206 total votes, just edging out rival, Miami (OH) who had 7 first place votes and 202 total votes.

Recruiting

Schedule

Roster

Coaching staff
The Bowling Green Falcons have seen numerous changes in the coaching staff.  Offensive Coordinator Mick McCall left the team to take the same position at Northwestern, while former Buffalo head coach, Jim Hofher, was named Quarterbacks Coach, Troy Rothenbuhler was named Passing Game Coordinator, Matt Campbell was named running game coordinator, and Doug Phillips was named recruiting coordinator.

Game summaries

Pittsburgh

The Falcons opened the 2008 campaign against nationally ranked Pitt at Heinz Field in Pittsburgh, Pennsylvania in front of 45,063 and a national television audience on ESPNU.  The Falcons came in as 13-point underdogs against the Panthers, who had previously been 25-2 against the MAC and 24-0 at home against the conference.  Pittsburgh showed their poise early on in the game scoring on their first offensive drive of the game with an 11-yard run by running back LeSean McCoy to cap off an eight play, 71-yard drive that took less than four minutes to complete.  Pitt would extend their lead in the early in the second quarter with 4 yard touchdown pass to Derek Kinder from quarterback Bill Stull, making the score 14–0 in favor of Pitt.  The Falcons would answer back against the Panthers on the following possession, marching down the field 73 yards in eight plays, capped off with a five-yard pass to Jimmy Scheidler from wide receiver Freddie Barnes, cutting Pitt's lead to 14–7.  Scheidler would bring in his second touchdown reception of the game six and a half minutes later on a three-yard touchdown pass from quarterback Tyler Sheehan, which tied the game at 14–14.  Pitt would answer back on the following possession as their Lou Groza Award candidate kicker Connor Lee booted 36 yard field goal as time expired in the first half, giving Pitt the halftime lead 17–14.

The game would become a story of two halves as the Falcons came out and as the Falcons defense slowed down the powerhouse McCoy and forced Pitt to two fumbles and an interception.  Bowling Green would take their first lead of the game with an 8-yard run by wide receiver Anthony Turner with 3:53 left in the third quarter.  The preceding extra point was blocked by Pitt and the Falcons took the lead of 20–14.  Early in the fourth quarter the Bowling Green defense caused Pitt's third fumble and seemed to return it to the end zone for an apparent game-winning touchdown, but due to an inadvertent whistle, Bowling Green was stripped of the touchdown, but still took over possession of the ball at Pitt's 11-yard line.  The Falcons would make good on their field position scoring on an 11-yard run on a quarterback draw by Sheehan which increased the Falcons' lead to 27–17.  Pitt continued to attempt to mount a comeback but after Lee's missed field goal of 42 yards at 3:58 left in the fourth quarter blew the wind out of Pitt's sails and Stull being intercepted in the end zone by Kenny Lewis with 1:26 left in the game officially put Pitt away.  The Falcons improved to 1–0 on the season and had their second consecutive season opening victory over a BCS Conference opponent (having defeated Minnesota 32–31 in overtime the year before), although being outgained by the Pitt offense 393–254.  Sheehan lead the Falcons in the passing game completing 24 of 40 attempts for 163 yards, 1 touchdown, and an interception, followed by Barnes who was 2 of 2 for 27 yards and a touchdown.  The Falcons' running game was led by Chris Bullock who had 7 rushes for 44 yards, followed by Turner and Sheehan who each had a rushing touchdown.  Bullock also led the receivers with 7 receptions for 49 yards along with Scheidler who had 3 receptions for 30 yards and two touchdowns.  Jamal Brown led the Falcons defense with 14 tackles, followed by Antonio Smith's 12.  Smith, Lewis, and Enrique Dozier each forced fumbles, with Lewis, Dozier, and Angelo Magnone each recovering a fumble and Lewis snagging the lone interception for the Falcons defense.  The Falcons were able to sack Stull four times, twice by Bronko Nagurski Trophy candidate Diyral Briggs and once each by Smith and Dozier.

Minnesota

Boise State

Wyoming

Eastern Michigan

Akron

Miami (OH)

Northern Illinois

Kent State

Ohio

Buffalo

Toledo

Statistics

Team

Scores by quarter

Offense

Rushing

Passing

Receiving

Defense

Special teams

References

Bowling Green
Bowling Green Falcons football seasons
Bowling Green Falcons football